John Carmichael, 1st Earl of Carmichael (28 February 1638 – 20 September 1710), known as Lord Carmichael between 1672 and 1701, when he was created the 1st Earl of Hyndford, was a Scottish nobleman and politician.

He succeeded his grandfather, James Carmichael, 1st Lord Carmichael (1579–1672), as second Lord Carmichael in 1672. He was Keeper of the Privy Seal of Scotland from 1689, Lord High Commissioner to the General Assembly of the Church of Scotland in 1690 and 1694–9. He was Secretary of State from 1699 to 1702, and supported the Union with England. He was a colonel of Dragoons from 1693 to 1697. His wife was Beatrix. Their daughter Beatrix married John Cockburn of Ormiston.

References

 The Scottish Peerage

1638 births
1710 deaths
Earls of Hyndford
Chancellors of the University of Glasgow
Lords High Commissioner to the General Assembly of the Church of Scotland
Scottish unionists
18th-century Scottish people
Members of the Privy Council of Scotland
Members of the Convention of the Estates of Scotland 1689